William B. Martin (May 13, 1866 – January 22, 1931) was an American sport shooter, who competed in the 1908 Summer Olympics.

At the 1908 Olympics he won a gold medal in the team military rifle event. In the Autumn of 1917, Martin was elected Union County, New Jersey Clerk. He assumed office for a five-year term and was twice re-elected.

References

External links
William Martin's profile at databaseOlympics

1866 births
1931 deaths
American male sport shooters
ISSF rifle shooters
United States Distinguished Marksman
Shooters at the 1908 Summer Olympics
Olympic gold medalists for the United States in shooting
Olympic medalists in shooting
Medalists at the 1908 Summer Olympics
Sportspeople from Elizabeth, New Jersey